Dorum was a German fishing trawler that was requisitioned by the Kriegsmarine in the Second World War for use as a Vorpostenboot, serving as V 204 Dorum and V 407 Dorum. She was scuttled at, or near, Bordeaux, Gironde, France on 28 August 1944.

Description
The engine was built by Deschimag, Wesermünde. It was rated at 96nhp and drove a single screw propeller via a low pressure turbine, double reduction gearing and a hydraulic coupling.

History
Dorum was built as yard number 592 by Deschimag, Wesermünde. She was launched in September 1937 and completed on 10 October. The ship was built for Ernst Glässel, Wesermünde. The Code Letters DFCX were allocated. She initially carried the fishing boat registration PG519, which was later changed to BB92. On 10 September 1939, the vessel was requistioned by the Kriegsmarine. She was allocated to 2 Vorpostenflotille as V 204 Dorum. On 21 October, she was transferred to 4 Vorpostenflotille as V 407 Dorum. On 28 August 1944, Dorum was scuttled, either in the Gironde, or at Bordeaux, Gironde, France.

Post-war, Dorum was raised and repaired. In 1949, she was renamed General Aupick under French ownership. On 12 April 1957, she sprang a leak and sank in the Doggerbank.

References

Sources

1937 ships
Fishing vessels of Germany
Steamships of Germany
Auxiliary ships of the Kriegsmarine
Maritime incidents in August 1944
Merchant ships of France
Steamships of France
Maritime incidents in 1957